Judith Ference Olson (born October 19, 1957, in Pittsburgh, Pennsylvania) is a judge at the Superior Court of Pennsylvania. She was first elected on November 3, 2009, and her ten-year term began in January 2010. She was retained in the 2020 election to serve an additional ten-year term, until January 2030.

Education and legal career
Olson was born 1957 in Pittsburgh, Pennsylvania. She attended Saint Francis University where she obtained her Bachelor of Arts degree in 1979. She then attended Duquesne University School of Law in Pittsburgh, Pennsylvania where she enrolled for a JD program, she graduated in 1982. Judith Olson started her career as a Law clerk for Honorable Maurice B. Cohill in 1982 and served there for two years. In 1984, she became a partner with Dickie, McCamey & Chilcote, a law firm in Pittsburgh. In 2000, she left Dickie, McCamey & Chilcote to join Schnader Harrison Segal & Lewis as a partner. She remained a partner with the law firm for eight years. In 2008, she was elected judge of Judge Court of Common Pleas for Allegheny County. She served until 2009.

In 2009, she was elected a Judge of the Pennsylvania Superior Court.

References

1957 births
Living people
People from Pittsburgh
Justices of the Supreme Court of Pennsylvania
Judges of the Superior Court of Pennsylvania
Pennsylvania lawyers